was a railway station on the Towada Kankō Electric Railway Line located in the town of Rokunohe, Aomori Prefecture, Japan. It was 8.4 rail kilometers from the terminus of the Towada Kankō Electric Railway Line at Misawa Station.

History
Furusato Station was opened on December 1, 1934.

The station was closed when the Towada Kankō Electric Railway Line was discontinued on April 1, 2012.

Lines
Towada Kankō Electric Railway
Towada Kankō Electric Railway Line

Station layout
Furusato Station had a single side platforms serving bidirectional traffic. There was a small weather shelter on the platform, but no station building. The station was unattended.

Platforms

Adjacent stations

See also
 List of Railway Stations in Japan

References
 Harris, Ken and Clarke, Jackie. Jane's World Railways 2008-2009. Jane's Information Group (2008).

External links
Totetsu home page 
Location map 

Railway stations in Japan opened in 1934
Railway stations in Aomori Prefecture
Railway stations closed in 2012
Defunct railway stations in Japan